Tři sestry (Czech for "three sisters") is a Czech punk band. Some of their later material has fallen into a more general rock genre, and they have also dabbled in hardcore punk. They are one of the most popular rock bands in the country and have played at the Masters of Rock music festival in 2005 and 2011. The band's main songwriter, lead singer, and best-known member of the band is Lou Fanánek Hagen, whose real name is František Moravec. The other current members of the band are Veronika "Supice" Borovková (harmonica, vocals), Tomáš "Ing. Magor" Doležal (bass), Ronald Seitl (guitar), Zdeněk Petr (guitar), Rostislav "Rosťa" Cerman (guitar), Petr "Bubenec, Franta Vrána" Lukeš (drums), and Martin "Jaroušek" Roušar (saxophone, clarinet).

History
The origins of the band are uncertain, as most members were still in high school when the ensemble began to coalesce.

1980s
In 1985, a few friends who had previously played in the band Spálená tlumivka created their own group and named it Tři sestry. The name was invented by Jiří "Hadr" Brábník, the band's original drummer. The band's initial lineup consisted of Jiří Brábník, Tomáš "Sup" Karásek (harmonica), Petr "Dachau" Jírovec (guitar), and Tomáš Doležal (bass). Not long after, three vocalists were added to the group: František Moravec, Simona "Síma" Bártová, and Petr "Bombur" Kratochvíl. Tři sestry played their first official concert in the spring of 1986 at Klub 001 in Strahov, a district of Prague. In the summer of 1986, vocalist Fanánek was seriously injured by a passing train, severing one of his legs (he now wears a prosthesis), and the band's performances were interrupted. In 1987, vocalists Síma and Bombur left the band and Luděk "Nikotýn" Pallat joined on guitar. They performed with two guitarists for a while but eventually Jírovec left. In January 1988, they recorded an album, which was released only in 1995, under the title Rarity. At the end of the 1980s, there were various personnel changes in the group, including several stints by guitarist František Sahula (a former member of Spálená tlumivka, who left Tři sestry in 2004 and was found murdered in 2008), who wrote some of the band's biggest hits, including "Život je takovej".

1990s
Tři sestry released their first album, Na Kovárně to je nářez (At the Forge, it's a Battle), in 1990. Throughout the 1990s and beyond, the band continued to release new albums on a regular basis. They added violinist František Kacafírek to their ranks in 1991. In 1993, the original harmonica player, Sup, was replaced by Miloš "Sup II" Berka. In 1994, guitarist Nikotýn left the group and was replaced by Ronald Seitl and the returning František Sahula. The band suffered a big loss in January 1996, when drummer Hadr tragically died. He was replaced a year later by Bubenec. That same year also saw the departure of Sup II, who was replaced by Supice. František Sahula left the ensemble again in 1997, and Miroslav "Cvanc" Cvanciger took his place.

21st century
On 10 June 2000, the group celebrated its 15th birthday with a concert in Prague on Štvanice island. At the turn of the millennium and then again in 2003 and 2004, František Sahula briefly rejoined the band. In 2003, they added guitarist Zdeněk Petr. At this point, the band consisted of Lou Fanánek Hagen, Ing. Magor, Franta Vrána, Supice, Ronald Seitl, Zdeněk Petr, Martin Roušar, and František Kacafírek on violin (whose career with the band ended upon his death in 2016). On 1–2 May 2008, Sahula was murdered.

Band members

Current members
 Lou Fanánek Hagen - vocals and lyrics; occasional drums, saxophone, bass, percussion
 Tomáš Doležal - bass; bandleader, manager
 Veronika Borovková – accordion, vocals
 Ronald Seitl – guitar
 Zdeněk Petr – guitar
 Rostislav Cerman – guitar
 Petr Lukeš – drums
 Martin Roušar – saxophone, clarinet

Past members
 Jakub Maleček – 1988–1991 - bass
 Petr Kratochvíl (stage name Václav Kahuda) – 1985–1987 - vocals
 Miroslav Cvanciger – 1997–2003 - guitar
 Jakub Čistecký – 1985–1990 - percussion, drums
 Petr Jírovec – 1985–1987 - guitar
 Jiří Brábník – 1985–1996 - drums
 Luděk Pallat – 1987–1994 - guitar
 František Sahula – 1988–2004 - guitar, vocals
 Simona Bártová – 1985–1987 - vocals
 Ilma Maršíčková – 1984-1986 - vocals, violin
 Tomáš Karásek – 1985–1993 - harmonica
 Miloš Berka – 1993–1996 - harmonica
 František Kacafírek – 1993–2016 (on and off) - violin

Discography
 Na Kovárně to je nářez (1990)
 Alkáč je největší kocour, aneb několik písní o lásce (1991)
 Švédská trojka (1993)
 25:01 (1993)
 Hudba z marsu (1995)
 Rarity (1995)
 Zlatí hoši (1996)
 Průša se vrací (1998)
 Průša se vrací + 3x bonus (1998)
 Soubor kreténů (1999)
 Hlavně že je večírek — 15 let Souboru kreténů (2000)
 15 let jsem Na Kovárně na plech (2000)
 Do Evropy nechceme — Tři sestry a Krakonoš (2002)
 Lihová škola umění, aneb Válka s loky (2003)
 Na eXX (2005)
 20 let naživu (2006)
 Platinum Collection (2007)
 Rocková nadílka od Tří sester a Divokýho Billa - split album with Divokej Bill (2007)
 Mydlovary (2007)
 Beatová síň slávy (together with Visací zámek) (2009)
 Lázničky (2010)
 25 let na Džbáně (2010)
 Superlázničky (2010)
 Z garáže (2011)
 V aréně (2011)
 Líná hudba, holý neštěstí (2013)
 Fernet Underground (2015)
 "30" v ještě větší Aréně (2016)
 ¡Svobodu ředkvičkám! (2018)
 Platinum Maxxximum (2020)
 Sex drógy rokenról (2021)

DVDs
 20 let naživu (2006)
 Beatová síň slávy (together with Visací zámek) (2009)
 Super Lázničky (2010)
 V aréně (2011)
 O2 Aréna Live (2016)

Box sets
 30 BOX (2014)

References

External links

 

Czech punk rock groups
Musical groups established in 1985
1985 establishments in Czechoslovakia